This is the list of Schedule II drugs as defined by the United States Controlled Substances Act.
The following findings are required for drugs to be placed in this schedule:
 The drug or other substance has a high potential for abuse.
 The drug or other substance has a currently accepted medical use in treatment in the United States or a currently accepted medical use with severe restrictions.
 Abuse of the drug or other substances may lead to severe psychological or physical dependence.

The complete list of Schedule II drugs follows. The Administrative Controlled Substances Code Number for each drug is included.

References

Controlled Substances Act
Drug-related lists